"Torna a Surriento" is a Neapolitan song composed in 1894 by Italian musician Ernesto De Curtis to words by his brother, the poet and painter Giambattista De Curtis. The song was copyrighted officially in 1905, and has become one of the most popular of this traditional genre; others include "'O sole mio", "Funiculì funiculà", and "Santa Lucia".

History 
Tradition holds that the origin of the song dates to 1902, when Guglielmo Tramontano, mayor of Sorrento, asked his friend Giambattista De Curtis to write the song for the Prime Minister Giuseppe Zanardelli, then vacationing at his seaside hotel, the Imperial Hotel Tramontano; it was claimed that the piece was meant to celebrate Zanardelli's stay.

Some claim the song is a plea to Zanardelli to keep his promise to help the impoverished city of Sorrento, which was especially in need of a sewage system. The song reflects the beauty of the city's great surroundings and the love and passion of its citizens.

More recent research indicates that the song may merely have been reworked for the occasion; family papers indicate that the brothers deposited a copy with the Italian Society of Authors and Editors in 1894, eight years before they claimed to have written it.

Neapolitan lyrics ("Torna a Surriento")

English translation ("Come Back to Sorrento")

Other recordings

"Torna a Surriento" has been sung by performers as diverse as:
Zhanna Aguzarova
Frank Sinatra
Bono
Ahmad Zahir
Beniamino Gigli
Dean Martin
Jerry Vale
Anna German
Connie Francis
Enrico Caruso
José Carreras
Plácido Domingo 
Luciano Pavarotti
Ruggero Raimondi
Meat Loaf
Mario Lanza
Franco Corelli 
Nino Martini
Robertino Loreti
Giuseppe Di Stefano
Muslim Magomayev
Francesco Albanese
Jerry Adriani
Roberto Carlos
Alfie Boe
Anna Calvi
Karel Gott
Il Volo
Anatoliy Solovianenko,
Robertino Loreti
Katherine Jenkins and Norton Buffalo with George Kahumoku Jr.
Sergio Franchi covered the song for his 1962 RCA Victor Red Seal debut album (Romantic Italian Songs), which peaked at No. 17 on the Billboard Top 200.
A comedic version by Billy Connolly entitled, "Saltcoats at the Fair".
Claude Aveling wrote the English-language lyrics, which are titled "Come Back to Sorrento". Doc Pomus and Mort Shuman re-arranged it and wrote a new set of lyrics for Elvis Presley ("Surrender").
Roberto Alagna
Elīna Garanča

Popular culture
In the television show The Honeymooners, Ralph Kramden identifies the song in preparing for his appearance on a quiz show called "The $99,000 Answer". He mistakenly identifies it as "Take Me Back to Sorrento" and says it was written by "Ernesto Dequista", which his friend Ed Norton says is "absolutely correct".

See also
Bing Crosby recorded a version titled "The Story of Sorrento" on December 11, 1947, with Victor Young and His Orchestra.
"Surrender" is an English version recorded by Elvis Presley.
"Take Me In Your Arms" is an English version recorded by Dean Martin and included in his album Dino: Italian Love Songs (1962).

References

External links
 Lyrics
 
 
 Russian lyrics

1902 songs
Neapolitan songs
Songs about cities